The Justice Against Sponsors of Terrorism Act (JASTA) is a law enacted by the United States Congress that narrows the scope of the legal doctrine of foreign sovereign immunity. It amends the Foreign Sovereign Immunities Act and the Anti-Terrorism and Effective Death Penalty Act in regards to civil claims against a foreign state for injuries, death, or damages from an act of international terrorism.

Previously, U.S. citizens were permitted to sue a foreign state if such state was designated as a state sponsor of terrorism by the United States Department of State and if they were harmed by that state's aid for international terrorism. JASTA authorizes federal courts to exercise subject matter jurisdiction over any foreign state's support for acts of international terrorism against a U.S. national or property regardless of whether such state is designated as a state sponsor of terrorism.

The bill passed the Senate with no opposition in May 2016 and, in September 2016, was unanimously passed by the House of Representatives. On September 28, 2016, both houses of Congress passed the bill into law after overriding a veto from President Obama which had occurred five days earlier. This was the only presidential veto override of Obama's administration.

The practical effect of the legislation was to allow the continuation of a longstanding civil lawsuit brought by families of victims of the September 11 attacks against Saudi Arabia for its government's alleged role in the attacks, though the law does not mention Saudi Arabia by name.

Congressional support and objections
The lead sponsors of the legislation in the United States Senate were John Cornyn, Republican of Texas, and Chuck Schumer, Democrat of New York. The bill was originally introduced in December 2009, and was last reintroduced to the Senate on September 16, 2015, and passed by the Senate on May 17, 2016, by a voice vote. In the House of Representatives, the bill's lead sponsors were Representative Peter T. King, Republican of New York, and Representative Jerrold Nadler, Democrat of New York; the legislation had more than 50 cosponsors.

White House Press Secretary Josh Earnest stated, shortly before the Senate voted on the legislation, that the White House was concerned that the JASTA could put the United States, its taxpayers, its service members, and its diplomats at "significant risk" if a similar law is to be adopted by other countries. On September 12, 2016, the bill unanimously passed the House of Representatives. On the same day the House passed the bill, Josh Earnest confirmed that President Obama was very likely to utilize his power to veto, which he did on September 23, 2016. An override of the veto was considered likely, but not certain, because the original vote was passed by a voice vote not requiring individual lawmakers to record their positions. An override requires a recorded vote of the positions of all lawmakers. On September 28, 2016, the Senate voted to override the veto with 97 senators voting in favor, with Senate Minority Leader Harry Reid being the sole no vote and with Senators Tim Kaine and Bernie Sanders not voting. The House followed suit later the same day, passing the bill into law over the president's objections by a 348–77 vote. The veto override was the only override during Obama's presidency.

Predicted impact

U.S.–Saudi Arabia relationship

The bill has raised tensions with Saudi Arabia. When the bill was introduced, the Saudi government "threatened" to sell up to $750 billion in United States Treasury securities and other U.S. assets if the bill is passed. A number of independent economic analysts told the New York Times that Saudi Arabia would be unlikely to follow through on such threats, "saying that such a sell-off would be difficult to execute and would end up crippling the kingdom's economy".

An official at Saudi Arabia's Ministry of Foreign Affairs told the state-run Saudi Press Agency on September 29, 2016, that the U.S. Congress must correct the 9/11 bill to avoid "serious unintended consequences", adding the law is of "great concern" to the Kingdom.

Status of sovereign immunity
John B. Bellinger III, former Legal Adviser of the Department of State warned that the bill could encourage other countries to enact measures that limit sovereign immunity, including that of the United States. Law professor Curtis Bradley at Duke University told ABC News that the bill could result in U.S. citizen lawsuits against potentially any country. Bradley also said that it could lead to legal response in other countries against U.S. activities such as drone strikes and military aid to Israel. Government attorney Joshua Claybourn argued in The American Spectator that international sovereign immunity benefits the United States more than other nations due to significant U.S. foreign activity — diplomatic, economic, and military. Moreover, Claybourn noted America's "relatively deep pockets also make the United States a particularly attractive target".

On September 30, 2016, the law went into effect when the first lawsuit was officially filed against the Kingdom of Saudi Arabia. Stephanie Ross DeSimone alleged the kingdom provided material support to al Qaeda and its leader, Osama bin Laden, in a complaint which was filed at a U.S. court in Washington, D.C. Her suit was also filed on behalf of the couple's daughter. DeSimone was two months pregnant when her husband, United States Navy Commander Patrick Dunn, was killed while working at the Pentagon during the September 11 attacks.

The new law was also expected to allow up to 9,000 plaintiffs from the New York area to sue Saudi Arabia as well. Soon after the law was passed, a group of lawyers stated that they expected that a federal judge would once again take up the cases originally filed in courtrooms across the U.S., but that several years ago were consolidated into one suit in the Southern District of New York.

Lawsuit against Saudi Arabia under JASTA

On March 20, 2017, 1,500 injured survivors and 850 family members of 9/11 victims filed a lawsuit against the Kingdom of Saudi Arabia. Plaintiffs allege that the government of Saudi Arabia had prior knowledge that some of its officials and employees were al Qaeda operatives or sympathizers. The complaint alleged that Saudi Arabia "knowingly provided material support and resources to the al Qaeda terrorist organization and facilitating the September 11th Attacks".

On March 2, 2020, the plaintiff in the lawsuit filed a letter stating that potential witnesses have received numerous threats. Saudi Arabia is  seeking to obtain the identity of all witnesses to the case.

See also
 Alleged Saudi role in the September 11 attacks
 9/11 Commission Report
 The 28 pages

References

External links
 Text of the Act
 House Debate on September 11 Lawsuits on C-SPAN
 9/11 TERRORIST ATTACKS LAWSUIT

Saudi Arabia–United States relations
Terrorism in the United States
Terrorism laws in the United States
Acts of the 114th United States Congress
Foreign sovereign immunity in the United States
Aftermath of the September 11 attacks